Zabovci is a settlement in the Municipality of Markovci in northeastern Slovenia. It lies just north of Lake Ptuj east of Ptuj. The area is part of the traditional region of Styria. It is now included with the rest of the municipality in the Drava Statistical Region.

References

External links
Zabovci on Geopedia

Populated places in the Municipality of Markovci